"C'est la Vie" is a song by Irish girl group B*Witched. It served as their debut single and the lead single from their self-titled debut studio album (1998). Written by band members Edele Lynch, Keavy Lynch, Lindsay Armaou, and Sinéad O'Carroll, Ray "Madman" Hedges, Martin Brannigan and Tracy Ackerman, it was released by Epic and Glowworm Records on 25 May 1998.

Despite receiving mixed reviews from critics, the song was a huge success for the band after it reached number one on the charts in various countries around the world, including the United Kingdom, Ireland and New Zealand. In the process, B*Witched became the youngest girl group ever to have a UK number one. In the United States, "C'est la Vie" reached number nine on the Billboard Hot 100. In 1999, it was nominated for "Best Song Musically and Lyrically" in the Ivor Novello Awards. The accompanying music video for the song features the four girls dancing around a lush green field full of bright flowers with a puppy as they playfully tease a teenage boy.

Background and release 
"C'est la Vie" was written by B*Witched, Ray "Madman" Hedges, Martin Brannigan, and Tracy Ackerman. The song features many cheeky double entendres, the band commenting in 2013 "it went over children's heads, but the parents got the innuendos. It was perfect for everyone."

Critical reception 
Chuck Taylor of Billboard wrote, "This European creamsicle has already tickled the top of the European pop charts, and with good reason. It's catchy as all get-out, has a chorus that lingers like poison ivy, and adds unlimited spoonfuls of zip spin after spin. In a perfect world, this dancey helping of youth-oriented pop would have no problem conquering the States with its giddy melody and squeaky-clean teenage vocals, but sadly, top 40 has again entered one of those periods during which it shuns most any uptempo track that might be considered plain and simple fun. That's a shame, given the growing profile of this personable Dublin-based female quartet and its fine self-titled debut album. In any case, open-minded programmers who have had success with Britney Spears or Cleopatra should certainly give this a meaningful spin and let their audiences have a chance to catch on to the magic of this fearless track." In 1999, the song was nominated for "Best Song Musically and Lyrically" at the Ivor Novello Awards. Billboard named the song number 97 on their list of 100 Greatest Girl Group Songs of All Time.

Chart performance 
"C'est la Vie" debuted at number one on the UK Singles Chart on 31 May 1998 and remained at the top the following week. It also went to number one in the group's home country of Ireland, as well as in New Zealand. The song went to number nine on the US Billboard Hot 100 in the week of 17 April 1999 and number six on the Australian ARIA Singles Chart. It went Platinum in Australia for sales of over 70,000 copies. By September 2017, over 927,000 copies of the single had been sold in the UK.

Music video 
The music video for the song was directed by Alison Murray, who later also directed the UK video for "Rollercoaster". It begins with the four girls lying on the ground in a field of daisies on a sunny day. A dog is introduced into the clip next to one of the girls and the quartet then begin dancing and singing to a teenage boy in a treehouse. The girls then tie the boy to a tree and the dog chases toward him before he is bombarded with lipstick kiss marks all over his face. The boy is freed from the tree and the girls hose him with water and begin performing an Irish reel before lying back down in the field where they began.

Track listings 

UK CD1
 "C'est la Vie" – 2:52
 "We Four Girls" – 1:52
 "B*Witched Quiz Show" – 2:26

UK CD2 and Australian CD single
 "C'est la Vie" – 2:52
 "C'est la Vie" (K-Klass Epic Klub remix) – 7:25
 "C'est la Vie" (Skynet Glass Palace vocal mix) – 8:02
 "C'est la Vie" (Dog in the River mix) – 6:45

UK cassette single and European CD single
 "C'est la Vie" – 2:52
 "We Four Girls" – 1:52

US 7-inch single
A. "C'est la Vie" – 2:52
B. "Get Happy" – 3:04

US maxi-CD single
 "C'est la Vie" – 2:52
 "Get Happy" – 3:04
 "C'est la Vie" (K-Klass Epic Klub remix) – 7:25
 "C'est la Vie" (Skynet Glass Palace vocal mix) – 8:02
 "C'est la Vie" (Dog in the River mix) – 6:45
 "B*Witched Quiz Show" – 2:26
 "Snippets" ("We Four Girls", "Rollercoaster", "To You I Belong") – 1:35

Credits and personnel 
Credits are lifted from the B*Witched album booklet.

Studio
 Produced in Ray "Madman" Hedges' Mothership

Personnel
 B*Witched – writing
 Ray "Madman" Hedges – writing, production, arrangement
 Martin Brannigan – writing, arrangement
 Tracy Ackerman – writing
 Erwin Keiles – guitar
 Daniel Collier – fiddle

Charts and certifications

Weekly charts

Year-end charts

Certifications

Release history

References 

1998 debut singles
1998 songs
B*Witched songs
Epic Records singles
Irish Singles Chart number-one singles
Number-one singles in New Zealand
Number-one singles in Scotland
Song recordings produced by Ray Hedges
Songs written by Edele Lynch
Songs written by Martin Brannigan
Songs written by Ray Hedges
Songs written by Tracy Ackerman
UK Singles Chart number-one singles